Heidi Vivian Polania Francois (commonly known as Vivian Polania; born ) is a Colombian constitutional lawyer, municipal criminal judge, and social media influencer. Her use of Instagram has resulted in her being known as “Jueza hot” (English: "the hot judge"). She has attracted criticism for her social media activities and for appearing online in court smoking a cigarette , and wearing only underwear. She was warned for her behaviour in 2020, and suspended in 2022 until 2023.

Education 
Polania is a graduate of the Catholic University of Colombia and specialised in constitutional law at Del Rosario University. In November 2022, she was studying for a master's degree in human rights.

Career 
After graduation, Polania worked as a lawyer at the Supreme Court of Justice of Colombia, before working at the Sectional Council of the Judiciary in Bogotá, and later at the 24th municipal criminal court. In 2018, she  relocated to Cucuta to become the municipality's first criminal judge.

Aside from her legal work, Polania markets clothing sold by US-companies via her Instagram account, which had 283,000 followers in November 2022. Polania's Instagram content includes photos of her exercise routines and her wearing lingerie. In 2020, Polania received a judicial warning about her decorum. Polania has also been the subject of complaints about her 37 tattoos. In an interview with the Argentinian newspaper, La Nacion she quoted the Colombian Constitution of 1991 pointing out the right to freedom of expression and that her personal life and work life are separate.

In 2020, a solicitor reported Polania to Colombia’s National Commission of Judicial Ethics after she appeared in online court wearing only underwear and smoking a cigarette. In November 2022, the commission suspended her until February 2023.

Personal life 
Polania was aged 34 in 2022.

References

External links 
 

1980s births
Colombian lawyers
Colombian judges
Del Rosario University alumni
Living people